William Bonnifield  (September 14, 1814 – November 18, 1875), also known as William Bounifield and William Bonnefield, was the Mayor of Kansas City, Missouri, elected in 1863, during the American Civil War. However, most of the City Council had sided with the South and cut off Bonnifield’s pay. He held office for one month, after which he resigned and moved to Denver, Colorado.

Biography
William was born on September 14, 1814 in Randolph County, Virginia, the second son of Rhodham and Sarah Nancy (Minear) Bonnifield. Sarah Nancy Minear was the daughter of David and Catherine (Saylor) Minear.
William attended Allegheny College in Meadville, Pennsylvania in 1836/7 then joined his family in Iowa where they had moved. 
Between 1839 and 1840 several members of the Bonnifield family died in a cholera epidemic, Rhodham and Sarah were among those who died. William, being the second oldest son, cared for his younger siblings on the farm until 1848. 
On the 3rd of August 1843, William Bonnifield married Sarah Ann Jackson in Henry County, Iowa. By 1860 William Bonnifield  and his family moved to Kansas City, Division Thirty-Five, Jackson County, Missouri. William was a Democrat, pro Union and anti Slavery. While living in Colorado William Bonnifield along with the McGee family mined in the Running Creek, Colorado area.

Accomplishments
1839: William Bonnifield was the first elected surveyor of Jefferson County, Iowa and helped lay out the town of  Fairfield and set the stakes for the first Court House, he also assisted in the construction of the Court House.
1843: William Bonnifield  was appointed as U.S. Postmater for Lockridge, Jefferson, Iowa Territory. (Appointment Date 3 Jan 1843)
1846: William Bonnifield was a co-leader of the two democratic mass-meetings in Fairfield, Iowa when a constitution for the new State of Iowa was under consideration.
1863: William Bonnifield  was elected Mayor of Kansas City, however most of the City Council had sided with the South and cut off William’s pay. He held office for one month after which he resigned and moved to Denver, Colorado.
1875: Nov 18, 1875 William Bonnifield died from injuries he had received the previous day,  he was hauling a load of wood when the horses spooked, William fell under the wagon wheels which crushed several ribs on his left side and also injured his head and face.

References

1814 births
1875 deaths
Mayors of Kansas City, Missouri
19th-century American politicians